R. Bruce Dold is a Pulitzer Prize winning journalist and is the publisher and editor-in-chief of the Chicago Tribune.

Early life and education 
Dold (full name Robert Bruce Dold) was born March 9, 1955, in Newark, NJ, to Robert Bruce Dold and Margaret (Noll). He grew up in Glen Ridge, NJ, and from 1973 to 1978 he attended Northwestern University in Evanston, IL, where he received a B.S. and M.S. in Journalism.

Professional career 
Dold was hired as a suburban reporter by the Chicago Tribune in 1978. He also contributed to Downbeat Magazine as a jazz critic. The Tribune hired him as a regular reporter in 1983, and he became a political writer before joining the editorial board in 1990. In 1995, he became deputy editorial page editor and columnist at the Tribune. In 1993, while a member of the editorial board, he wrote a 10-part series that won the Pulitzer for editorial writing. The citation read: "For his series of editorials deploring the murder of a 3-year-old boy by his abusive mother and decrying the Illinois child welfare system."

In 2000, Dold was named editorial page editor. The Tribune subsequently earned a dozen national awards for editorials. It received the 2003 Pulitzer Prize for editorial writing and was a finalist for the Pulitzer Prize in 2009, 2010 and 2011.

In February 2016, Dold was named editor of the Chicago Tribune, following former Tribune editor-in-chief Gerould Kern.

Personal life 
Dold, who is Roman Catholic, married Eileen Claire Norris in 1982. They have two daughters, Megan and Kristen.

References

External links

Living people
1955 births
Northwestern University alumni
Chicago Tribune people